Fredric George Lehne (born February 3, 1959) is an American actor of film, stage, and television.

Acting since 1978, he has appeared in more than 200 films, mini-series, and television episodes, as well as stage productions across the United States, from Broadway to Portland, Oregon. He is best known for his role as the demon Azazel on the long-running television show Supernatural, he also appeared as Marshal Mars on Lost, as Eddie in the original television series Dallas, and as Frank McCann on American Horror Story.

Lehne appeared in such miniseries/television movies as the original Billionaire's Boy's Club, From the Earth to the Moon and Coward of the County. His film credits include Ordinary People, Being There, Men in Black, Con Air, Zero Dark Thirty, and The Dark Knight Rises.

Filmography

References

External links
 

1959 births
Male actors from New York (state)
American male film actors
American male stage actors
American male Shakespearean actors
American male television actors
Living people
People from Onondaga County, New York